Christmas Memories is the second Christmas album and twenty-ninth studio release by American singer Barbra Streisand. It was released on October 30, 2001, by Columbia. Streisand recorded the album during July, August, and September 2001 in various recording studios throughout California and in North Vancouver. It was executive-produced by Streisand and Jay Landers, while William Ross and David Foster served as additional producers. The album contains several cover versions of various holiday songs. To promote Christmas Memories, Columbia Records released an advance sampler version of the album titled A Voice for All Seasons.

The record's mood was described as melancholic, which music critics found fitting due to the album's release occurring soon after the September 11 attacks. Other reviewers called the album "beautifully rendered" and "excellent". Christmas Memories received a Grammy nomination for Best Traditional Pop Vocal Album in 2003. Commercially, it entered the charts in Canada and the United Kingdom. It also charted in the United States, where it peaked at number 15 on the Billboard 200 and was certified platinum by the Recording Industry Association of America for shipments of 1,000,000 copies. Streisand's cover of "It Must Have Been the Mistletoe" charted on the Adult Contemporary chart in the United States, peaking at number 28.

Background 
Christmas Memories is Barbra Streisand's second Christmas album, following 1967's A Christmas Album. Streisand began taking part in recording sessions for the album on July 19, 2001; on this day, she recorded both "I'll Be Home for Christmas" and "I Remember". Sessions took place throughout California and in North Vancouver. Streisand and Jay Landers are credited as the executive producers of Christmas Memories, with musicians David Foster and William Ross also receiving additional production credits. According to the liner notes, Streisand dedicated the album to the late artist Stephan Weiss, husband of fashion designer Donna Karan, who was close friends with Streisand before his death in June 2001.

Christmas Memories was released on October 30, 2001, by Columbia. To promote the album, Columbia Records issued advertisements in several American magazines, including in InStyle, People, Talk, and Vanity Fair. A sampler album/extended play featuring five tracks from Christmas Memories was also released in 2001 and includes "Grown-Up Christmas List", "It Must Have Been the Mistletoe", "I'll Be Home for Christmas", "Closer", and "One God".

Music and songs 
The album opens with a cover of "I'll Be Home for Christmas", a war song written by Kim Gannon, Walter Kent, and Buck Ram; William Ruhlmann from AllMusic considered the inclusion of this track on Christmas Memories to reflect Streisand's "mature perspective that very much takes loss into consideration". "A Christmas Love Song" is the second track and was written by Alan and Marilyn Bergman and Johnny Mandel. Author Tom Santopietro described the song's message as "an embrace of the holidays filled with honest sentiment". A "jazzy" rendition of Frank Loesser's "What Are You Doing New Year's Eve?" is the third song, followed by a reworked cover of "I Remember" by Stephen Sondheim. Streisand's cover of the latter song was described as "[still] an extremely sad song" by Ruhlmann. "Snowbound" was written by Russell Faith and Clarence Kehner, is set in a "moderately slow" tempo, and features the use of a piano. "It Must Have Been the Mistletoe" was considered by the staff at Show Music to be one of the many songs on the album to "focus on love".

"Christmas Lullaby" was written by Ann Hampton Callaway, who had previously collaborated with Streisand on Higher Ground (1997) and A Love Like Ours (1999). The Bergmans reworked Don Costa's "Christmas Mem'ries", which is included as the album's eighth track. Costa is credited as the song's original arranger, whereas Eddie Karam is credited for the extra arranging. "Grown-Up Christmas List" was written and produced by Foster and co-written by Linda Thompson. It contains a live orchestra that was arranged and conducted by Ross. Santopietro considered Franz Schubert's "Ave Maria" to be a nice "companion" to Charles Gounod's "Ave Maria", which she first included on A Christmas Album in 1967. "Closer" is dedicated to the singer's friend Stephan Weiss, who died before the album's recording sessions began. In the liner notes, Streisand wrote, "I'm singing 'Closer' about Stephan, but I was hoping it could relate to anyone who's lost someone". The album closes with "One God", which was written by Ervin Drake and Jimmy Shirl; Drake learned that Streisand had recorded the track after they had previously collaborated on Higher Ground, when she covered a track of his called "I Believe". On the Target and iTunes editions of the album, bonus track cover of "God Bless America" is included and produced by Streisand and Landers.

Critical reception 

Billboards Melinda Newman described the record as "a fine collection" and "beautifully rendered"; she also found Streisand's heavy amount of detail able to "elevate [...] the quality of this project far above the usual Christmas fare". Tom Santopietro, author of The Importance of Being Barbra, considered it to be Streisand's "most consistently successful CD" since The Broadway Album (1985). He called her "song choices [...] uniformly excellent" and stated that "I'll Be Home for Christmas", "What Are You Doing New Year's Eve?", and "One God" were the album's three best tracks. William Ruhlmann, of AllMusic, opined that the album "may come to seem like a remarkably dour holiday collection" due to its release taking place after the September 11 attacks, but overall found that its mood "could hardly be improved upon" given the situation. He felt that this exemplified the ability of "great artists", such as Streisand, to create and release music that "take[s] the temperature of the times with their work". Alexa Camp from Slant Magazine claimed that Christmas Memories contains "timeless holiday ambience courtesy of a consummate pro"; however, she considered the songs between "Snowbound" and "Grown-Up Christmas List" to be boring.

Accolades 
Streisand was nominated at the 45th Annual Grammy Awards under the Best Traditional Pop Vocal Album category for Christmas Memories. However, she lost to Tony Bennett and his album Playin' with My Friends: Bennett Sings the Blues (2001).

Commercial performance 
Christmas Memories debuted on the Billboard 200 at number 32 on November 17, 2001. During its best-selling week, it sold 136,000 copies and peaked at number 15. In total, it spent nine weeks within the Billboard 200. It also topped the Top Holidays Albums chart. The album was certified platinum by the Recording Industry Association of America (RIAA) on December 3, 2001, for shipments of 1,000,000 copies. As of June 2007, the album has sold 1,100,000 copies. In Canada, it peaked at number 49 on the Canadian Albums Chart compiled by Nielsen. It also entered the UK Albums chart where it spent one week at number 137.

"It Must Have Been the Mistletoe" was distributed to United States radio stations during the Christmas season, allowing it to debut and peak at number 28 on the Adult Contemporary chart for the week ending January 5, 2002.

Track listing 
Songwriting credits adapted from AllMusic.

Personnel 
Credits adapted from the liner notes of the deluxe edition of Christmas Memories.

 Barbra Streisand producer , vocals, executive producer
 Renata Buser assistant
 Jorge Calandrelli arranger , conductor 
 Sue Ann Carwell background vocals 
 Don Costa original arranger 
 Felipe Elgueta mixer , engineer 
 Martin Erlichman label representative
 Bob Esty choir conductor , vocal arranger 
 David Foster producer , harmonica , rhythm arranger 
 Humberto Gatica engineer 
 Chad M. Goodson CD design
 Eddie Karam arranger 

 Nathaniel Kunkel engineer 
 Peter Doell engineer, assistant engineer
 Jay Landers producer , executive producer
 Ian Logan photography
 Gabrielle Raumberger art direction
 David Reitzas mixer , engineer
 William Ross producer , arranger , conductor 
 Al Schmitt engineer 
 Bill Schnee mixer 
 Kim Skalecki assistant
 Allan Stein album project coordinator
 Wendi Wagner background vocals 
 Firooz Zahedi photography
 Michael Mishaw background vocals

Charts

Weekly charts

Year-end charts

Certifications

See also 
 List of Billboard Top Holiday Albums number ones of the 2000s

References

Citations

Bibliography

External links 
 

2001 Christmas albums
Albums produced by David Foster
Barbra Streisand albums
Christmas albums by American artists
Columbia Records Christmas albums